Macroschisma compressum is a species of sea snail, a marine gastropod mollusk in the family Fissurellidae, the keyhole limpets and slit limpets.

Distribution
This species occurs off the following locations:
 Madagascar
 Red Sea

References

External links
 Biodiversity Heritage Library (3 publications)
 World Register of Marine Species

compressum
Gastropods described in 1850